John Munro Longyear, Sr. (April 15, 1850 – May 28, 1922) was an American businessman and noted developer of timber and mineral lands in the Upper Peninsula of Michigan who became the central figure behind the Arctic Coal Company, which surveyed and mined coalfields on Spitsbergen, now Svalbard, from 1905 to 1916. This company developed a settlement on Spitsbergen able to accommodate up to around 500 people which became known as Longyear City, now Longyearbyen, adjacent Advent Bay.

Biography 
Longyear was born in Lansing, Michigan, on April 15, 1850, the son of U.S. Congressman John Wesley Longyear (1820–1875) and Harriet Longyear (née Harriet Munro, 1826–1917). It is unclear how many siblings Longyear had, but it is known that he had two brothers named Howard and James and a sister named Ida. Through his mother, Longyear was reportedly the great-great-great grandchild of the Scottish American soldier William Munroe. In young life Longyear suffered various health problems and was prone to exhaustion.

In 1873, when he was 23, Longyear moved to Marquette, Michigan, and for over 20 years established himself as an expert in identifying iron ore properties for mines. One of the mines he was involved with in Iron Mountain, Michigan, became one of the largest underground mines in the United States. He was one of the founders, c. 1890, of the Huron Mountain Club near Big Bay, Michigan, and also served as its first president. In 1906, he founded the Arctic Coal Company with long-time associate Frederick Ayer and several other small shareholders. Longyear was the main owner of the Arctic Coal Company with headquarters in Boston, Massachusetts. Longyear had visited Svalbard in 1901, and bought the Trondhjem Spitsbergen Kulkompani in 1906.

Store Norske Spitsbergen Kulkompani started as a consortium of Norwegian investors in 1916. It purchased Arctic Coal Company's and Ayer and Longyear's lands and operations on Spitsbergen in that year. They went on to develop major coal-mining operations in the Advent Valley region and at Sveagruva, originally a Swedish coal-mining operation.

In 2005 Longyear was inducted into the National Mining Hall of Fame.

Longyearbyen, Longyear Hall of Pedagogy, Longyear Building, Longyear Valley, and Longyear River are named after him.

Personal life 
Longyear married Mary Beecher Longyear (née Mary Hawley Beecher, 1851-1931) on January 4, 1879, in Battle Creek, Michigan. Mary was a Christian Scientist and a philanthropist, perhaps best known for her involvement in the publication of the first braille version of the KJV Bible. The couple had seven children together: Judith F. Longyear, Robert D. Longyear, Howard M. Longyear, Abby B. Roberts, Helen M. Paul, John B. Longyear, and John M. Longyear, Jr. Some sources list the Longyears as having only five children but this discrepancy is likely due to that Howard and John died young, Howard M. Longyear at 20 and John B. Longyear as a toddler. For some years, the family was accompanied by a nurse, a young German woman named Angela Nerling, who both lived and traveled with them.

In the early 20th century, Longyear made the decision to move from Michigan, where his family lived in a stone mansion on the shores of Lake Superior, to Massachusetts. His wife Mary was reportedly unsettled by the idea of leaving the family's home and so, Longyear arranged for the home to be dismantled and transported 1,300 miles across the country by railroad to their new hometown and reassembled there in 1903. Longyear lived out the rest of his life in Brookline, Massachusetts. He died at his home there on May 28, 1922.

References

Further reading

External links 
 
 About Mary and John Longyear Longyear Museum
 Scenes from Svalbard (former Spitzbergen), including Longyearbyen: Photo essay 4/2014

1850 births
1922 deaths
American energy industry businesspeople
American mining businesspeople
Mayors of places in Michigan
Businesspeople from Lansing, Michigan
People from Brookline, Massachusetts
Mining in Svalbard
Converts to Christian Science